There are three sets of Indium halides, the trihalides, the monohalides, and several intermediate halides. In the monohalides the oxidation state of indium is +1 and their proper names are indium(I) fluoride, indium(I) chloride, indium(I) bromide and indium(I) iodide.

The intermediate halides contain indium with oxidation states, +1, +2 and +3.

Indium trihalides
In all of the trihalides the oxidation state of indium is +3, and their proper names are indium(III) fluoride, indium(III) chloride, indium(III) bromide, and indium(III) iodide. The trihalides are Lewis acidic. Indium trichloride is a starting point in the production of trimethylindium which is used in the semiconductor industry.

Indium(III) fluoride
InF3 is a white solid, m.p. 1170 °C. Its  structure contains 6 coordinate indium.

Indium(III) chloride
InCl3 is a white solid, m.p. 586 °C. It is obtained by oxidation of indium with chlorine. It is isostructural with AlCl3.

Indium(III) bromide
InBr3 is a pale yellow solid, m.p. 435 °C. It is isostructural with AlCl3. It is prepared by combining the elements. InBr3 finds some use in organic synthesis as a water tolerant Lewis acid.

Indium(III) iodide

InI3 is a yellow solid.  It is obtained by evaporation of a solution of indium in HI. Distinct yellow and a red forms are known. The red form undergoes a transition to the yellow at 57 °C. The structure of the red form has not been determined by X-ray crystallography, however spectroscopic evidence indicates that indium may be six coordinate.  The yellow form consists of In2I6 with 4 coordinate indium centres. It is used as an "iodide getter" in the Cativa process.

Intermediate halides
A surprising number of intermediate chlorides and bromides are known, but only one iodide, and no difluoride. Rather than the apparent oxidation state of +2, these compounds contain indium in the +1 and +3 oxidation states.  Thus the diiodide is described as InIInIIIX4. It was some time later that the existence of compounds containing the anion   were confirmed which contains an indium-indium bond. Early work on the chlorides and bromides involved investigations of the binary phase diagrams of the trihalides and the related monohalide. Many of the compounds were initially misidentified as many of them are incongruent and decompose before melting. The majority of the previously reported chlorides and bromides have now either had their existence and structures confirmed by X Ray diffraction studies or have been consigned to history. Perhaps the most unexpected case of mistaken identity was the surprising result that a careful reinvestigation of the InCl/InCl3 binary phase diagram did not find InCl2. The reason for this abundance of compounds is that indium forms 4 and 6 coordinate anions containing indium(III) e.g. ,  as well as the anion  that surprisingly contains an indium-indium bond.

In7Cl9 and In7Br9
In7Cl9 is yellow solid stable up to 250 °C that is formulated InI6(InIIICl6)Cl3

In7Br9 has a similar structure to In7Cl9 and can be formulated as InI6(InIIIBr6)Br3

In5Br7
In5Br7 is a pale yellow solid. It is formulated InI3(InII2Br6)Br. The InII2Br6 anion has an eclipsed ethane like structure with a metal-metal bond length of 270 pm.

In2Cl3 and In2Br3
In2Cl3 is colourless and is formulated InI3 InIIICl6 In contrast In2Br3 contains the In2Br6 anion as present in In5Br7, and is formulated InI2(InII2Br6) with a structure similar to Ga2Br3.

In4Br7
In4Br7 is near colourless with a pale greenish yellow tint. It is light sensitive (like TlCl and TlBr) decaying to InBr2 and In metal. It is formulated  InI5(InIIIBr4)2(InIIIBr6) The reasons for the distorted lattice have been ascribed to an antibonding combination between doubly filled, non-directional indium 5s orbitals and neighboring bromine 4p hybrid orbitals.

In5Cl9
In5Cl9 is formulated as InI3InIII2Cl9.

InBr2 
InBr2 is a greenish white crystalline solid, which is formulated InIInIII Br4. It has the same structure as GaCl2. InBr2 is soluble in aromatic solvents and some compounds containing η6-arene In(I) complexes have been identified. (See hapticity for an explanation of the bonding in such arene-metal ion complexes). With some ligands InBr2 forms neutral complexes containing an indium-indium bond.

InI2
InI2 is a yellow solid that is formulated InIInIIII4.

Monohalides
The solid monohalides InCl, InBr and InI are all unstable with respect to water, decomposing to the metal and indium(III) species. They fall between gallium(I) compounds, which are more reactive  and thallium(I) that are stable with respect to water. InI is the most stable. Up until relatively recently the monohalides have been scientific curiosities, however with the discovery that they can be used to prepare indium cluster and chain compounds they are now attracting much more interest.

InF
InF only known as an unstable gaseous compound.

InCl
The room temperature form of InCl is yellow, with a cubic distorted NaCl structure. The red high temperature (>390 K) form has the \beta-TlI structure.

InBr
InBr is a red crystalline solid, mp 285 °C. It has the same structure as \beta-TlI, with an orthorhombic distorted rock salt structure. It can be prepared from indium metal and InBr3.

InI
InI is a deep red purple crystalline solid. It has the same structure as \beta-TlI. It can be made by direct combination of its constituent elements at high temperature. Alternatively it can be prepared from InI3 and indium metal in refluxing xylenes. It is the most stable of the solid monohalides and is soluble in some organic solvents. Solutions of InI in a pyridine/m-xylene mixture are stable below 243 K.

Anionic halide complexes of In(III)
The trihalides are Lewis Acids and form addition compounds with ligands. For InF3 there are few examples known however for the other halides addition compounds with tetrahedral, trigonal bipyramidal and octahedral coordination geometries are known.
Additionally there are examples of indium with square planar geometry in the InX52− ion.

and 
The salt LiInF4 has been prepared,  however it has an unusual layer structure with octahedrally coordinated indium center. Salts of InF63−,  and   have all been made.

and 
The  ion has been found to be square pyramidal in the salt (NEt4)2InCl5, with the same structure as (NEt4)2 TlCl5, but is trigonal bipyramidal in tetraphenylphosphonium pentachloroindate acetonitrile solvate.

The  ion has similarly been found square pyramidal, albeit distorted, in the Bis(4-chloropyridinium) salt    and trigonal bipyramidal    in Bi37InBr48.

The  ions contain a single bridging halogen atom.  Whether the bridge is bent or linear cannot be determined from the spectra. The chloride and bromide have been detected  using electrospray mass spectrometry. The  ion has been prepared in the salt CsIn2I7.

Anionic halide complexes of In(I) and In(II)

and 
InIX2− is produced when the In2X62− ion disproportionates. Salts containing the  ions have  been made and their vibrational spectra interpreted as showing that they have C3v symmetry, trigonal pyramidal geometry, with structures similar to the isoelectronic  ions.

,  and 
Salts of the chloride, bromide and iodide ions  have been prepared.

Neutral Indium(II) halide adducts
Following the discovery of the In2Br62− a number of related neutral compounds containing the InII2X4 kernel have been formed from the reaction of indium dihalides with neutral ligands. Some chemists refer to these adducts, when used as the starting point for the synthesis of cluster compounds as ‘In2X4’ e.g. the TMEDA adduct.

General sources
 WebElements Periodic Table » Indium » compounds information

References

Indium compounds
Metal halides
Mixed valence compounds